The 2021 Leeds City Council election took place on Thursday 6 May 2021 to elect members of Leeds City Council in England. It was held on the same day as other local elections across England and the rest of the UK, including the inaugural West Yorkshire mayoral election.

The election was originally scheduled for 7 May 2020, alongside the later cancelled 2020 West Yorkshire Police and Crime Commissioner election and other local elections across the UK, but was delayed for a year due to the COVID-19 pandemic.

As per the election cycle, both one third of the council's 99 seats and an additional casual vacancy in Roundhay ward were contested. Following the postponement of the original election in 2020, the incumbent councillors' terms have been extended for an additional year to their initial two-year term granted in 2018. All councillors elected in 2021 will serve a one-off three-year term, instead of the usual four-year term, to retain their original term end date of 2024.

The Labour Party maintained their majority control of the council despite losing two seats. The closest contest saw Labour hold Temple Newsam ward by 12 votes ahead of the Conservatives.

Election summary

|- style="text-align: right; font-weight: bold;"
! scope="row" colspan="2" | Total
| 183
| 34
| 2
| 2
| 
| 100%
| 100%
| 222,647
| 50,061

The election result had the following consequences for the political composition of the council:

Councillors who did not stand for re-election

Results

Adel & Wharfedale

Alwoodley

Ardsley & Robin Hood

Armley

Beeston & Holbeck

Bramley & Stanningley

Burmantofts & Richmond Hill

Calverley & Farsley

Chapel Allerton

Cross Gates & Whinmoor

Farnley & Wortley

Garforth & Swillington

Gipton & Harehills

Guiseley & Rawdon

Harewood

Headingley & Hyde Park

Horsforth

Hunslet & Riverside

Killingbeck & Seacroft

Kippax & Methley

Kirkstall

Little London & Woodhouse

Middleton Park

Moortown

Morley North

Morley South

Otley & Yeadon

Pudsey

Rothwell

Roundhay
A casual vacancy was contested alongside the regular election following the resignation of Eleanor Tunnicliffe (Labour Party) in March 2021. The highest-placed candidate, Lisa Martin, received the full term and the second-placed candidate, Zara Hussain, filled the vacancy to complete Tunnicliffe's term of office until 2022.

Temple Newsam

Weetwood

Wetherby

Notes

References

Leeds
2020
2020s in Leeds